Zdeňka Honsová (3 July 1927 in Jihlava – 16 May 1994) was a Czech gymnast who competed in the 1948 Summer Olympics.

Honsová was the highest women's gymnastics individual all-around scorer at these Olympics, continuing the legacy of major-games-all-around-first-place-winning established by her Czechoslovakian compatriate, the sport's first-ever women's World All-Around Champion and twice-first-place-finisher in the combined individual standings, Vlasta Děkanová, and continued later by another of her Czechoslovakian compatriates, two-time Olympic All-Around Champion Věra Čáslavská.

Honsova had a truly outstanding competition at these games in 1948, coming in 1st place in the individual total combined standings, the individual compulsory exercise combined standings, Flying rings, and balance beam (combined compulsory and voluntary score).  She was also the 2nd-place finisher on compulsory beam ( behind her teammate Bozena Srncova ), and the 4th-place finisher on compulsory vault.

Unfortunately, Honsová is not officially recognized as being an Olympic All-Around Champion like women gymnasts such as Larisa Latynina, Čáslavská, Nadia Comăneci, Elena Shushunova, or Simone Biles because individual medals were not awarded to women gymnasts at the Olympic games until 1952.  This is a lack-of-individual distinction that she shares with Trudi Meyer as well as with whoever was the highest scorer of the women's gymnastics competition at the 1928 Amsterdam Summer Olympic Games.

References

1927 births
1994 deaths
Czech female artistic gymnasts
Olympic gymnasts of Czechoslovakia
Gymnasts at the 1948 Summer Olympics
Olympic gold medalists for Czechoslovakia
Olympic medalists in gymnastics
Sportspeople from Jihlava
Medalists at the 1948 Summer Olympics